Craspedopoma hespericum is a species of tropical land snails with an operculum, terrestrial gastropod mollusks in the family Craspedopomatidae. This species is endemic to Portugal.

References

Molluscs of the Azores
Craspedopoma
Gastropods described in 1857
Taxonomy articles created by Polbot
Craspedopomatidae